This article is about Costa Rica and the World Bank 

The World Bank and Costa Rica have two active projects as of December 2018. The World Bank has been able to claim Costa Rica as a developmental success. Although Costa Rica has been actively working on reform to better the country and has the lowest poverty rate in Central America, it still remains a third world country, due to a slowdown in economic expansion, lack of job opportunities and lack of resources, especially in rural areas. Despite these challenges Costa Rica has been working with the World Bank to further move Costa Rica up the global ranks.

Country overview 
Costa Rica has become one of the more wealthy countries in the region overall, being an upper middle income country with GDP per capita being US$13,876. Costa Rica differentiates from its neighbors by being relatively stable politically, providing high standards of living and effective social benefit systems.

The country's main income source besides exports is ecotourism, due to the biodiversity in the country. Although advanced economically and policy wise for the region, Costa Rica has struggled with the poverty rate, stagnant for the past twenty years. Costa Rica has made strides towards universal health care and education.

With projects like Costa Rica Higher Education and Strengthening Universal Health Insurance in Costa Rica, done with The World Bank, Costa Rica has the opportunity to make desired changes with the funds it receives for these projects. Costa Rica began their relationship with the World Bank in September 1956 when they received US$3 million for the Capital Goods Importation Credit Project. Costa Rica currently has an LPI score of 2.79 and the LPI rank of 73 as of 2018. Since then, Costa Rica has seen stable economic growth for the past 25 years, growing GDP from 2010 to 2016 and being a leader in environmental policies. With growing inequality and rising fiscal debt, the government has struggled on how to address these issues with regards to the general public and transparent social programs.

Relationship with World Bank 
The World Bank had a presence in Costa Rica for quite some time. With the first project being in 1956, the World Bank was able to maintain buildings within the country until 1990.

The World Bank office in San Jose had closed in 1990 due to unwelcoming political climate at the time. Costa Rica shifted to ecomarket projects, since environmentally cautious policy was important within this country, but at the time the World Bank had no presence. These events all lead to the World Bank making another effort to support Costa Rica and try to reenter. The World Bank entering back into Costa Rica was an easy decision because there were high hopes for a return of investment.

The Country Partnership Framework (CPF) for 2016–2020 is a document that the World Bank and the government of Costa Rica put together in order to improve relations. Costa Rica has had four CPF's prepared for them and have been able to maintain relatively positive throughout the years. Through natural learning and knowledge sharing Costa Rica and the World Bank have been able to takes steps to tackling some of the more ambitious policy changes Costa Rica wants to enact while also providing positive information for investments. The World Bank wants to provide further resources that are environmentally friendly and aiming for growth within rural territories of the country. These rural areas are not intended to change but to grow more productive so other industries can effectively develop and improve competitiveness.

Active projects  
There are currently two active projects within Costa Rica with the World Bank that total US$620 million. Strengthening Universal Health Insurance in Costa Rica, is a project, approved on March 15, 2016, with the commitment amount of US$420 million. The Costa Rica Higher Education is the second project within Costa Rica and the World Bank, that was approved on September 27, 2012 with the commitment of 200 million US dollars.

Strengthening Universal Health Insurance in Costa Rica, main goals are to provide timely and quality health services, and improving the Costa Rican social security administration (CCSS) to be more efficient. This project will replace severally damaged hospitals so that the CCSS can open up more resources for other investments, including hospitals, while also strengthening health care programs for the countries population. This project is set to close in April 2020.

The Costa Rica Higher Education project main purpose is to strength the educational system within Costa Rica so that intern they will be more appealing to outside investments for scientific and technology development and innovation. Within this project there are two components one focusing on institutions and the second focusing on institutions capacity to for quality enhancement which includes, developing a market and supporting projects within high education institutions. This project is set to close in December 2019.

References 

World Bank Group relations
Costa Rica